Doosra Aadmi is a 1977 Hindi-language romantic drama film, produced by Yash Chopra and directed by Ramesh Talwar. The film stars Raakhee, Rishi Kapoor, Neetu Singh and Shashi Kapoor. The film's music is by Rajesh Roshan.

Plot summary
Nisha (Raakhee), accomplished in advertising industry, becomes a recluse after the tragic death of her boyfriend, Shashi Saigal (Shashi Kapoor). Years later, Karan Saxena (Rishi Kapoor) offers her employment with his advertising agency and she accepts. She realizes that Karan, recently married to Timsy (Neetu Singh), reminds her of Shashi.

Cast

 Rakhee Gulzar - Nisha
 Rishi Kapoor -  Karan Saxena aka Kannu 
 Neetu Singh - Timsy Saxena
 Shashi Kapoor - Shashi Sehgal
 Deven Verma -  Timsi's Uncle
 Parikshat Sahni - Bhisham
 Satyen Kappu - Ram Prasad Saxena (as Satye`ndra Kappu)
 Gita Siddharth - Mrs. Saxena 
 Javed Khan Amrohi as Kannu's friend
 Jagdish Raj - Police Inspector
 Vikas Anand - Bank Manager
 Kiran Vairale as Kannu's friend
 Roopesh Kumar as Rupesh
 Lalita Kumari as Kanya Kumari
 Yunus Parvez as constable Naik
 Ramesh Tiwari as Sharma
 Rajan Verma as (Raj Verma) Train master 
 Beena Banerjee
 Rajee Singh as Timsy's aunty Shanti
 Sheetal as Mini

Crew
 Art Direction – Desh Mukherji
 Costume Design – Jennifer Kapoor, Rajee Singh

Soundtrack
The soundtrack includes the following tracks, composed by Rajesh Roshan, and with lyrics by Majrooh Sultanpuri.

Trivia 
 The movie that Karan & Nisha watch in the Excelsior cinema hall (when Timsy is following them) is '40 Carats (1973)'
 When Karan is following the train in his car, the background music that plays is of song 'Pyar hua, ikraar hua hai' from the movie 'Shree 420 (1955)'
 This movie was remade as 'Dil ne phir yaad kiya (2001)

Awards 

 25th Filmfare Awards:

Nominated

 Best Actress – Raakhee
Best Supporting Actress – Raakhee
Best Comedian – Deven Verma
Best Story – Raju Saigal

References

External links
 
 Doosra Aadmi at Yash Raj Films

1977 films
1970s Hindi-language films
Yash Raj Films films
Films scored by Rajesh Roshan
Films directed by Ramesh Talwar
Indian romantic drama films